Enoch Moore may refer to:

 Inky Moore (1925–2000), conservation advocate
 Enoch Moore (Loyalist turned rebel) (1779–1841)